Hullah is a surname. Notable people with the surname include:

Glynis Hullah (born 1948), English cricketer
John Pyke Hullah (1812–1884), English composer and teacher
Paul Hullah (born 1963), English writer
Peter Hullah (born 1949), British Anglican bishop